This is a list of universities and colleges in Ethiopia. It includes both public and private institutions.

Universities and colleges

|}

References 

 
Universities
Ethiopia
Ethiopia